Grenada–Mexico relations are the diplomatic relations between Grenada and the United Mexican States. Both nations are members of the Association of Caribbean States, Organization of American States and the United Nations.

History
Grenada and Mexico established diplomatic relations on 11 April 1975. Since the establishment of diplomatic relations; relations between both nations have taken place in primarily multilateral forums. In 1983, Mexico condemned the United States invasion of Grenada and demanded respect to the territorial integrity and sovereignty of Grenada. Mexico also urged international organizations to take the necessary measures for withdrawal of all foreign forces from Grenada.

In February 2010, Grenadian Prime Minister Tillman Thomas paid a visit to Cancún to attend the Mexico-Caribbean Community (CARICOM) summit. In November 2010, Grenadian Prime Minister Tillman Thomas returned to Cancún to attend the 2010 United Nations Climate Change Conference. In 2014, Mexico opened an honorary consulate in St. George's. In May 2014, Grenadian  Grenadian Prime Minister Keith Mitchell and Foreign Minister Nickolas Steele traveled to Mexico to attend the Mexico-Caribbean Community sumit in Mérida.

In 2004 Hurricane Ivan hit Grenada and destroyed the nation's Parliament building. Mexico financially contributed $13.5 million Eastern Caribbean dollars to the building of Grenada's new Parliament building. The new building was inaugurated in June 2014 and was attended by non-resident Mexican Ambassador Oscar Esparza-Vargas. In honor of Mexico's contribution, Grenada named the House of Parliament's library as Mexico Library, to commemorate the close ties between the two countries.

In March 2018, Mexican Foreign Minister Luis Videgaray Caso paid a visit to Grenada. Each year, the Mexican government offers scholarships for nationals of Grenada to study postgraduate studies at Mexican higher education institutions.

High-level visits
High-level visits from Grenada to Mexico
 Prime Minister Tillman Thomas (February & November 2010)
 Prime Minister Keith Mitchell (2014)
 Foreign Minister Nickolas Steele (2014)

High-level visits from Mexico to Grenada
 Foreign Minister Luis Videgaray Caso (2018)

Bilateral agreements
Both nations have signed a few bilateral agreements such as an Agreement in Educational and Cultural Cooperation (1981); Agreement for Cooperation in Development (2014) and an Agreement for the Establishment of a Consultation Mechanism in Matters of Common interest.

Trade
In 2018, trade between Grenada and Mexico totaled US$2.2 million. Grenada's main exports to Mexico include: cutting devices and parts; electrical circuits; and typewriter parts. Mexico's main exports to Grenada include: organic cleaning products; refrigerators and freezers; and stoves and boilers. Mexican multinational company Cemex operates in Grenada.

Resident diplomatic missions
 Grenada is accredited to Mexico from its embassy in Washington, D.C., United States.
 Mexico is accredited to Grenada from its embassy in Castries, Saint Lucia and maintains an honorary consulate in St. George's.

References 

Mexico
Grenada